James Francis Doyle (1840, Liverpool – 1913, Warrington) was an English architect. He was the grandfather of the singing star Anne Ziegler.

Buildings

References

1840 births
1913 deaths
Architects from Liverpool